The orange-footed scrubfowl (Megapodius reinwardt), also known as orange-footed megapode or just scrubfowl, is a small megapode of the family Megapodiidae.

This species comprises five subspecies found on many islands in the Lesser Sunda Islands as well as southern New Guinea and northern Australia. It is a terrestrial bird the size of a domestic chicken and dark-coloured with strong orange legs and a pointed crest at the back of the head. It utilises a range of forest and scrub habitats and has colonised many small islands throughout its range. It is prolific in suburban Darwin gardens, where people refer to it as a bush chook or bush turkey.

In general, populations seem to be stable and the conservation status of the species is considered to be of Least Concern.

The orange-footed scrubfowl feeds on seeds, fallen fruit and terrestrial invertebrates. As with other megapodes, it nests in large mounds of sand, leaf litter and other debris where the heat generated by the decomposition of organic material serves to incubate the eggs.

Some of the subspecies may be treated as full species, such as the Tanimbar scrubfowl (Megapodius tenimberensis), while other subspecies may be considered subspecies of other species (e.g., M. r. buruensis is sometimes considered a subspecies of the dusky megapode).

In Aboriginal language and culture
The Kunwinjku people of west Arnhem Land know this bird as kurrukurldanj.

References 

 Jones, Darryl N.; Dekker, Rene W.R.J.; & Roselaar, Cees S. (1995). The Megapodes. Oxford University Press: Oxford. 
 Marchant, S.; & Higgins, P.J. (Eds). (1993). Handbook of Australian, New Zealand and Antarctic Birds. Volume 2: Raptors to Lapwings. Oxford University Press: Melbourne.

External links 

 BirdLife Species Factsheet

orange-footed scrubfowl
Birds of the Lesser Sunda Islands
Birds of New Guinea
Birds of the Northern Territory
Birds of Queensland
orange-footed scrubfowl
orange-footed scrubfowl